Two-time defending champion Chris Evert defeated Wendy Turnbull in the final, 7–6, 6–2 to win the women's singles tennis title at the 1977 US Open. It was her third US Open title and her seventh major singles title overall.

This was the third and last edition of the tournament to be held on clay courts, as it would switch to hardcourts the following year.

Seeds
The seeded players are listed below. Chris Evert is the champion; others show the round in which they were eliminated.

  Chris Evert (champion)
  Martina Navratilova (semifinalist)
  Virginia Wade (quarterfinalist)
  Sue Barker (third round)
  Betty Stöve (semifinalist)
  Rosie Casals (fourth round)
  Billie Jean King (quarterfinalist)
  Dianne Fromholtz (fourth round)
  Kerry Reid (fourth round)
  Mima Jaušovec (quarterfinalist)
  Kristien Shaw (first round)
  Wendy Turnbull (finalist)

Qualifying

Draw

Finals

Earlier rounds

Section 1

Section 2

Section 3

Section 4

Section 5

Section 6

Section 7

Section 8

External links
1977 US Open – Women's draws and results at the International Tennis Federation

Women's Singles
US Open (tennis) by year – Women's singles
1977 in women's tennis
1977 in American women's sports